Norway has produced a number of famous rock bands, including Titanic, a-ha and Kaizers Orchestra.

1950s and 1960s
The most known rock and roll performers in the 1950s were Per Granberg, Per Hartvig (Rocke-Pelle), Jan Rohde and Odd Gisløy (Smiling Tommy). Gisløy even penned his own rock and roll composition: "Dancing with My Rockin' Shoes".

In the early 1960s the so-called Shadow bands (named after the British instrumental group The Shadows) were popular. Among the most notable were The Beatniks and The Vanguards. In the mid-1960s The Pussycats recorded two albums: one in Great Britain and one in West Germany, both produced by Sven-Erik Børja. Most of the songs were composed by group member Trond Graff.

1970s and 1980s
Titanic reached # 5 on the UK singles chart in 1971. Norway also has a notable progressive rock scene, which began in 1971 with the release of Junipher Greene's Friendship, the country's first double album.  Later, more progressive bands like Folque incorporated elements of traditional Norwegian folk music in their recordings.  Other bands include Ruphus,  Aunt Mary and Høst. This scene was in large part fueled by the success Frank Zappa had in Norway.

In the 80s Norway had A-Ha, Artch, Return, Stage Dolls and TNT, the first Norwegian band to be featured on the American Billboard charts. In the latter years of this decade a new generation of bands started to gain popularity. These were bands who sang in Norwegian. Here Norway got the "4 great ones": DumDum Boys, DeLillos, Raga Rockers and Jokke & Valentinerne. All these bands except Jokke (Joachim "Jokke" Nielsen died in 2000) are still active.

Since 1990
More recently, the Norwegian rock-scene has been dominated internationally by bands such as Turbonegro, Gluecifer and Madrugada, but several bands (like BigBang, Euroboys and Span) concentrate on the domestic market. The Stavanger hard rock band Kvelertak has been touring around the world with Purified in Blood among others since the release of their self-titled debut album in 2010. 

In the 1990s, Norway saw the growing of the underground black metal scene, with bands including Mayhem, Immortal, Enslaved, Darkthrone, Burzum, Gorgoroth, Satyricon and Dimmu Borgir. Industrial rock band Zeromancer was formed in 1999. A few members were formerly in the band Seigmen.

Since 2001, Kaizers Orchestra has been among the most important rock bands in Norway. The band employs a variety of unusual instruments including a pump organ and an accordion. They are known for their use of oil barrels, car wheels, and garbage cans as percussion instruments.

Norwegian music
Rock music by country